The Holzstöcke is an elongated, densely forested, mountain range running from north to south in the German state of Baden-Württemberg. It is a large, terraced landscape that is part of the Iller-Lech Plateau in the Alpine Foreland of south Germany. It lies southwest of the city of Ulm in the counties of Alb-Donau-Kreis and Biberach in Upper Swabia and rises above the valley floors by about 75 metres.

Mountains and hills 

The following is a list of the named high points in the Holzstöcke – sorted by height in metres (m) above Normalnull (NN):
 Runder Kopf (631.3 m), 1.3 km west-northwest  of Erolzheim; with transmission tower and water tower
 Roter Berg (629.2 m), 1 km south-southwest of Erolzheim
 Frohberg (Kapellenberg; ca. 629 m), immediately south-southwest of Erolzheim; with Froberg Chapel and water tower
 Gehrn (Gern; 621.7 m), 2 km north-northwest  of Berkheim
 Banberg (618.5 m), immediately west of Tannheim-Haldau
 Grafenberg (618.3 m), 2.5 km west-southwest of Kirchberg
 Totenkopf (615.6 m), 1 km east-southeast of Tannheim-Krimmel; with nearby Celtic schanze
 Weiherkopf (600.4 m), 1.3 km north-northwest  of Erolzheim
 Schlossberg (568.4 m), 1.2 km southeast of Gutenzell-Hürbel-Niedernzell; with the site of Gutenzell Castle Location: 
 Weißenberg (550.9 m), between Iller and Weihung near Illerrieden Location:

Gallery

References

External links 

 
BfN-Landschaftsteckbrief Holzstöcke – BfN (deutlich weniger ausführlich; etwas andere Grenzziehung, daher leicht erhöhte Fläche)

Regions of Baden-Württemberg
Alb-Donau-Kreis
Biberach (district)
Württemberg
Iller-Lech Plateau